Delvin Chanel N'Dinga  (born 14 March 1988) is a Congolese professional footballer who plays as a midfielder for Maltese Premier League club Balzan.

Club career

Auxerre
N'Dinga began his career with CNFF then joined Diables Noirs in 2003. In July 2005, he Diables Noirs to sign in Europe with French club Auxerre.

In the 2011–12 season, N'Dinga was linked with a move to Lyon as the replacement for Jérémy Toulalan, who joined Spanish side Málaga. Auxerre and Lyon were in the process of negotiating a transfer for Ndinga for €7 million, with Ndinga to sign a four-year contract with Lyon. N'Dinga said a move to Lyon interested him: "It would be a good challenge for me, the opportunity to pass a course, While there is a chance that I play in this club, I will not hesitate. There is Lyon who has, then yes, it m? Interested!" However, Auxerre club president Gérard Bourgoin refused to sell Ndinga, having rejected several offers from Lyon. The negotiations continued throughout the summer transfer window until N'Dinga signed a contract extension set to keep him at Auxerre until 2015. Shortly after, N'Dinga expressed sadness of not join Lyon, saying, "It takes time, honestly thought I leave. It hurt me. I try to focus quickly find my level."

Monaco
Following Auxerre's relegation from Ligue 1 after the 2011–12 season, N'Dinga joined Ligue 2 side Monaco in July 2012 in a €6 million transfer deal.

Olympiacos
Following his two league appearances at Monaco in the 2013–14 season, but on 31 August 2013, N'Dinga left the club to join Greek champions Olympiacos on loan, with an option to make the move permanent next summer with a fee of €3 million. He started a second loan spell with Olympiacos in July 2014. Olympiacos will buy Delvin with a mark of €3.2 million from the Monegasque team. N'Dinga is likely to head back to France over the summer, after spending the last two seasons on loan at Olympiakos from Monaco but according to reports in France he will possibly to return to League 1 in the summer transfer window. N'Dinga will not renew his contract with Monaco and it looks like that Saint-Étienne is in pole position to sign him. Apart from Saint-Etienne, Rennes, Lille and Caen also expressed their interested in the Congolese defensive midfielder.

Lokomotiv Moscow
After joining Russian club Lokomotiv Moscow on loan for the 2015–16 season, N'Dinga's move from Monaco was made permanent on 11 May 2016.

Sivasspor
On 7 September 2017, N'Dinga signed a two-year contract with Turkish club Sivasspor.

International career 
He made his first cap for Congo national football team at the WCQ match against Sudan on 8 June 2007.
He represented the national team at the 2015 Africa Cup of Nations, where his team advanced to the quarterfinals.

Career statistics

Club

International goals
Scores and results list Congo's goal tally first.

Honours
Monaco
Ligue 2: 2012–13

Olympiacos
Super League Greece: 2013–14, 2014–15
Greek Cup: 2014–15

Lokomotiv Moscow
Russian Cup: 2016–17

References

External links

frenchleague.com

1988 births
Living people
Pointe-Noire
Republic of the Congo footballers
Republic of the Congo international footballers
Republic of the Congo expatriate footballers
Association football midfielders
Ligue 1 players
Ligue 2 players
AJ Auxerre players
AS Monaco FC players
Expatriate footballers in France
Expatriate footballers in Monaco
FC Lokomotiv Moscow players
Olympiacos F.C. players
Expatriate footballers in Russia
Expatriate footballers in Greece
Russian Premier League players
Super League Greece players
Sivasspor footballers
Expatriate footballers in Turkey
2015 Africa Cup of Nations players
Republic of the Congo under-20 international footballers